Kassa is an Ethiopian name that may refer to
Given name
 Kassa (mansa) (died 1360), African ruler
Kassa Balcha (born 1955), Ethiopian long-distance runner
Kassa Haile Darge (1881–1956), Ethiopian nobleman and military commander
Tewodros II (born Kassa Haile Giorgis; c.1818–1868), Emperor of Ethiopia

Surname
Aberra Kassa (1905–1936), Ethiopian royalty and army commander 
Abraha Kassa, Director of National Security for Eritrea
Asrate Kassa (1922–1974), Ethiopian royalty and army commander 
Asfawossen Kassa (1913–1936), Ethiopian royalty and army commander 
Wondosson Kassa (1903–1936), Ethiopian royalty and army commander